155th Regiment may refer to:

 155th (Wessex) Transport Regiment, a unit of the United Kingdom Territorial Army
 155th Illinois Volunteer Infantry Regiment, a unit of the Union (North) Army during the American Civil War
 155th Pennsylvania Volunteer Infantry Regiment, also an American Civil War unit of the Union Army